In organic chemistry, an acyl cyanide is a functional group with the formula  and structure . It consists of an acyl group attached to cyanide.  Examples include acetyl cyanide, formyl cyanide, and oxalyl dicyanide.  Acyl cyanides are reagents in organic synthesis.

Synthesis
Classically acyl cyanides are produced by the salt metathesis reaction of acyl chlorides with sodium cyanide:

Alternatively, they can be produced by dehydration of acyl aldoximes:

Acetyl cyanide is also prepared by hydrocyanation of ketene:

Reactions
They are mild acylating agents.  With aqueous base, acyl cyanides break down to cyanide and the carboxylate:

With azides, acyl cyanides undergo the click reaction to give acyl tetrazoles.

References

Functional groups
Organic compounds